

The Bellanca 31-40 Senior Pacemaker and its derivatives were a family of a six- and eight-seat utility aircraft built in the United States in the late 1930s. They were the final revision of the original late 1920s Wright-Bellanca WB-2 design. The model numbers used by Bellanca in this period reflected the wing area (in this case, 310 square feet) and engine horsepower (400 and up in this series), each divided by ten. Like their predecessors, these were high-wing braced monoplanes with conventional tailwheel undercarriage.

A single Senior Skyrocket was bought by the United States Navy in 1938 for use as a utility transport, designated JE-1. Senior Skyrockets were also built under licence by Northwest Industries in Canada following World War II.

In 2007, a single example remains extant - the first Canadian-built aircraft (registration CF-DCH). It is preserved at the Reynolds-Alberta Museum.

Variants
 31-40 Senior Pacemaker - Wright Cyclone engine, 400 hp (298 kW)
 31-42 Senior Pacemaker - Fitted with a redesigned tail surface, accommodation for one pilot and five passengers, powered by a 550-hp (410-kW) Pratt & Whitney Wasp S3H1 radial piston engine.
 31-50 Senior Skyrocket - Pratt & Whitney Hornet engine, 550 hp (410 kW)
 L-11 - One 31-50 impressed into service by the United States Army Air Forces in Alaska in 1942. 
 31-55 Senior Skyrocket
 JE-1 - Senior Skyrocket version for US Navy with 570 hp (425 kW) engine
 de Luxe Senior Skyrocket - 31-55 with improved instrumentation and superior interior and exterior finishes, powered by a 525-hp (391-kW) Pratt & Whitney Wasp radial piston engine.
 Model 31-55A - Built under licence in Canada by Northwest Industries.

Operators

United States Army Air Forces
United States Navy

Widerøes Flyveselskap

Specifications (31-55 Senior Skyrocket)

References

 
 
 aerofiles.com

1930s United States civil utility aircraft
31-40
High-wing aircraft
Single-engined tractor aircraft
Aircraft first flown in 1935